The Animalist Party is a French political party focused on animal rights and against cruelty to animals.

History 
For the 2022 French legislative election, the party presented 421 candidates in the first round of this election, with the primary objective not of obtaining seats, but of highlighting the theme of the animal cause in France.

Election results

National Assembly 

Any vote received brings in 1,42 € per year for the five years of the mandate. With its 63,637 votes, the animalist party has thus benefited from a total of 45,000 € in subsidies for the last five years.   The money earned in 2022 is expected to be much higher.

European Parliament

See also 
 List of animal advocacy parties
 Ecological Revolution for the Living

References

External links 
 

Animal advocacy parties
Political parties in France
Political parties established in 2016
2016 establishments in France
Animal welfare organizations based in France
Organizations based in Auvergne-Rhône-Alpes